Eye of the Storm is a studio album by Frank Marino & Mahogany Rush. It was released on August 1, 2000, under Griffin Records.

Track listing
All songs by Frank Marino.

"Storm Warning..." - 2:51
"Eye of the Storm" - 9:54
"He's Calling" - 10:21
"Learned My Lesson Well" - 5:46
"Heat of the Moment" - 11:21
"Window to the World" - 7:56
"Since You Came into My Life" - 5:31
"Avalon" - 7:47
"Ordinary Man" - 10:49

Personnel
Frank Marino – Guitars, Vocals, Keyboards, Timpani
Mick Layne – Rhythm Guitar
Peter Dowse – Bass
Dave Goode – Drums, Percussion

Additional personnel
Billy Szawlowski, Frank Marino – Engineers

References

2000 albums
Frank Marino albums